The Odeon Theatre in Christchurch was the oldest masonry theatre in New Zealand, and one of only three remaining purpose-built 19th-century theatres in the country. The building has had different names over the years, and was put to many different uses. It was damaged beyond repair in the 22 February 2011 Christchurch earthquake and partially demolished in September 2012. The theatre was recognised as a Category I heritage building by the New Zealand Historic Places Trust, with registration number 3140. One of its most notable aspects was its use as a public meeting venue of Kate Sheppard during her women's suffrage campaign.

History

A syndicate of citizens formed the Public Hall Company Ltd and through this commissioned the building. The theatre, located in 214 Tuam Street, was built in 1883 to a design by Thomas Stoddart Lambert (1840–1915). It had a capacity of 2,200 people, 600 of whom fitted into the gallery. The building was opened on 20 July 1883, with the Mayor of Christchurch, George Ruddenklau, presiding.

The building's original name was Tuam Street Hall or Tuam Street Theatre. The building had a variety of rather diverse uses: public meeting place, entertainment, exhibitions, roller skate rink, and other activities. In 1893, it was used by Kate Sheppard for women's suffrage. After the 1893 Electoral Act was passed on 19 September 1893, which meant that New Zealand women were the first in the world to be granted the right to vote, an enrolment meeting was held by Sheppard at Tuam Street Hall on 26 September in preparation for the 1893 election in late November.  Despite rather unfavourable weather, 600 women were enrolled that day.

In 1894, the name changed to Opera House. Vaudeville was the main form of entertainment around the turn of the century, and John Fuller's son Benjamin started their theatre company's involvement with the building in 1903.

Sidney Luttrell was commissioned to remodel the building's interior, and the modified space opened on 26 December 1927, providing seating for 1,300 people. With the introduction of film in 1930, the name was once again changed, this time to St James. The stage remained, though, and the building was sometimes used for other purposes, for example live entertainment. St James closed for a period during the Great Depression. Notable performers during the 1940s include the Trapp Family Singers, Stanley Holloway, Johnny Devlin, Laurence Olivier, and Olivier's second wife Vivien Leigh.

Ownership changed in 1960 to Kerridge-Odeon Ltd, and the building was renamed Odeon and reopened on 27 September 1960. Extensive changes were undertaken, including the removal of the parapet, reduction of seating down to 720, updating of the cinema equipment, and introduction of a coffee lounge. Through competition with television, patronage declined and the theatre eventually closed. The building was purchased in 1983 by the Sydenham Assembly of God, who used it for religious gatherings from 1985.

The building was bought in 2003 by a group of businessmen, who in May 2004 applied for demolition consent. In response, the Odeon Theatre Trust was formed by residents concerned for the preservation of the building. Ownership changed again in December 2006, when Property Ventures Ltd, the development company of David Henderson, purchased it.  Property Ventures had its office in a building diagonally opposite the Odeon Theatre at 179 Tuam Street. When Henderson's companies got into financial difficulties, Christchurch City Council controversially bought five of his inner city land holdings in August 2008, but not the Odeon Theatre. Henderson was placed in bankruptcy in November 2010.

During the years of the Sydenham Assembly of God ownership, a large yellow illuminated cross was displayed on the theatre's frontage (the bracket still visible in photos post-2008). Henderson used the cross in the SOL Square development (located on the north side of the Property Ventures head office) and styled one of the bars as the Yellow Cross, prominently displaying the cross on the roof apex.

In 2009, Christchurch actor and director Mark Hadlow campaigned for the Odeon Theatre to be turned into an arts complex for an estimated NZ$60m.

Heritage listing
On 26 November 1981, the building was registered by the New Zealand Historic Places Trust as a Category I historic place, with the registration number 3140. The building is recognised as the once largest public meeting venue in Christchurch, the oldest remaining theatre in Christchurch, and the then country's oldest masonry theatre. Of significance is the use of the building by Kate Sheppard. Another aspect is the building's association with two important Christchurch designers, Lambert and S. Luttrell.

Earthquake damage
The building was severely damaged in the February 2011 Christchurch earthquake. Demolition was ordered by the Canterbury Earthquake Recovery Authority in January 2012.  In September of that year, the rear of the building was demolished.  The front of the building is protected by a stack of shipping containers placed in Tuam Street.The Regional Council Environment Canterbury (Ecan) purchased the building and adjoining sites from the Crown in as-is condition for $2.95 million in 2020. In March 2022, Ecan began tendering for business partners and proposals for the theatre's restoration. The Odeon has a category one listing with Heritage New Zealand, recognising it as a place of "special or outstanding historical or cultural heritage significance or value".

References

Theatres completed in 1883
Heritage New Zealand Category 1 historic places in Canterbury, New Zealand
Theatres in Christchurch
Christchurch Central City
Buildings and structures demolished as a result of the 2011 Christchurch earthquake
Buildings and structures demolished in 2012
1880s architecture in New Zealand
Women's suffrage in New Zealand